Oecophylla smaragdina (common names include Asian weaver ant, weaver ant, green ant, green tree ant, semut rangrang, semut kerangga, and orange gaster) is a species of arboreal ant found in tropical Asia and Australia. These ants form colonies with multiple nests in trees, each nest being made of leaves stitched together using the silk produced by the ant larvae: hence the name 'oecophylla' [Greek for 'leaf-house'].

Description
Workers and major workers are  mostly coloured orange. They forage, assemble and expand the nest.

Distribution and habitat
Oecophylla smaragdina has a widespread distribution in tropical Asia and Australia, its range extending from India through Indonesia and the Philippines to Northern Territory and Queensland in Australia. It is an arboreal species, making its nests among the foliage of trees. Nests are constructed during the night, with major workers weaving towards the exterior and minor workers completing the interior structure. The ant colony may have several nests in one tree, or the nests may be spread over several adjacent trees; colonies can reach up to half a million individuals. In one instance, a colony occupied 151 nests distributed among twelve trees. Each colony has a single queen, in one of these nests, and her progeny are carried to other nests of the colony. The average life of a mature colony may be eight years.

Ecology
Weaver ants of this species are important parts of the ecosystem in tree canopies in humid tropical regions. The nests of this species are constructed by the workers, with leaves being woven together and secured by silk produced by the larvae. First a row of ants line up along the edge of a green leaf and, grasping a nearby leaf, pull the two leaves together, edge to edge. Other workers on the far side of the leaves, each carrying a larva in its mouth, apply the tips of the abdomens of the larvae to each leaf edge in turn. This produces a suture of fine silken threads that secures the leaves together. More leaves are attached in a similar manner to enlarge the nest.

Weaver ants feed on insects and other invertebrates, their prey being mainly beetles, flies and hymenopterans. They do not sting, but have a painful bite into which they can secrete irritant chemicals from their abdomens. In the Oecophylla smaragdina, the antennal lobe glomeruli is seen in clusters, this appears to be a common feature in many Hymenopterans such as ants and honeybees. In Singapore, colonies are often found in sea hibiscus and great morinda trees which entice the ants with nectar, the trees in return receiving protection from herbivorous insects. In Indonesia, the trees supporting colonies include banana, coconut, oil palm, rubber tree, cacao, teak, jackfruit, mango, Chinese laurel, petai, jengkol, duku, rambutan, jambu air and kedondong.

The ants also attend aphids, scale insects and other homopterans to feed on the honeydew they produce, especially in tree canopies linked by lianas. For this purpose, they drive away other ant species from the parts of the canopy where these sap-sucking insects live. Another association is with the larvae of certain blue butterflies In Australia, the common oak-blue, the bright oak-blue and the purple oak-blue are obligate associates and only occur in parts of the country where the weaver ant is established. Shelters may be built by the ants close to their nests specially to protect these assets.

Some species of jumping spiders, such as myrmecophilic associate Cosmophasis bitaeniata, prey on the green tree ants by mimicking them with deceptive chemical scents. This is an example of Aggressive mimicry. Disguised as one of them, the jumping spiders access their nests to consume the larvae and lay their own eggs alongside the nest, so that spiderlings can easily reach the ant larvae. The jumping spider Myrmaplata plataleoides is a batesian mimic of this species. This spider visually mimics this ant, via contracted body parts to create the illusion of a hymenopteran body structure. It also has two black spots to mimic eyes on the side of its head. This spider also steals the ant's brood to obtain the scent of the colony. Despite this, they generally steer clear of weaver ant nests.

Uses

The larvae and pupae are collected and processed into bird food and fish bait in Indonesia, are used in Chinese and Indian traditional medicine, and consumed as a delicacy in Thailand and other countries.

In Java, Indonesia the larvae and pupae of these ants are known as kroto and are harvested commercially for use as captive songbird food and as fishing bait. Songbirds are very popular in Java and the ant larvae provide a good balanced diet of proteins, minerals and vitamins. Kroto can be bought from pet shops or can be gathered fresh from the countryside. As bait for fish, the larvae are mixed with chicken eggs, maize, beans and honey.

In some parts of India, the adult ants are used in traditional medicine as a remedy for rheumatism, and an oil made from them is used for stomach infections and as an aphrodisiac. In Thailand and the Philippines the larvae and pupae are eaten and are said to have a taste variously described as creamy, sour and lemony.

In some parts of this ant's range, colonies are used as a natural form of pest control. Crops that have been protected in this way have included cowpea, cashew, citrus, mango, coconut, cocoa and coffee. The oldest written record of the use of these ants to control pests is their use in China in 304 AD to control pests in citrus.

The ants are aggressive towards humans, and in Sri Lanka ant protection has been abandoned in coffee culture, because picking the crop proved too "painful".

Gallery

References

External links

Formicinae
Hymenoptera of Asia
Hymenoptera of Australia
Insects of India
Nepenthes infauna
Insects described in 1775
Taxa named by Johan Christian Fabricius